Sir Edward Loftus (1563–1601) was an Irish barrister, judge and soldier of the Elizabethan era.

He was born in Dublin, the second son of Adam Loftus, Archbishop of Dublin, and his wife Jane Purdon, daughter of James Purdon and Jane Little. His father was also Lord Chancellor of Ireland, and Edward followed him into the legal profession. He was Serjeant-at-law (Ireland) 1597–1601 and held office very briefly as Recorder of Dublin. He was noted for his legal scholarship, and wrote a manual listing all the legal terms which were then in common usage in the Irish Courts.

He was also a professional soldier who fought in the Nine Years War, and was knighted for his services to the English Crown by Robert Devereux, 2nd Earl of Essex, in 1599. He was killed at the Siege of Kinsale on 10 May 1601.

He married Anne Duke, daughter and co-heiress with her sister Mary of Sir Henry Duke of Castlejordan, County Meath and his wife Elizabeth Brabazon, daughter of Sir William Brabazon, Vice-Treasurer of Ireland and his wife, the much-married heiress Elizabeth Clifford. She died in childbirth shortly after Edward's death; their only child, a daughter, lived just a few days. Edward and Anne are buried in the family vault which his father had built in St. Patrick's Cathedral, Dublin.

Sources
Hart, A. R. A History of the King's Serjeants at law in Ireland Dublin Four Courts Press 2000
Lodge, John Peerage of Ireland London 1754
Stokes, Rev. Dudley Loftus- a Dublin Antiquary of the Seventeenth Century (1890) Journal of the Royal Society of Antiquaries of Ireland Series 5 Vol.1

Recorders of Dublin
Serjeants-at-law (Ireland)
Irish knights
Lawyers from Dublin (city)
Edward
1563 births
1601 deaths
Military personnel from Dublin (city)